This is a list of World War II military equipment originating in Romania.

Combat vehicles

Aircraft

All of the aircraft listed below were completed before the end of World War II. Prototypes are omitted from the list. Unless specified otherwise, all aircraft machine guns have the caliber of 7.92 mm. All of the data is sourced from:

Armored fighting vehicles

All of the data is sourced from:

Warships

Data for the monitors sourced from: and for the rest of the warships from:

Weapons

Other

Bungescu AA fire director 
Costinescu 6.6 kg 75 mm armor-piercing shell
T-1 tractor – 5 prototypes

Table of orders and deliveries for the land forces

Data from:

See also
 Arms industry in Romania
 Romanian armored fighting vehicle production during World War II
 Romanian military equipment of World War I

References 

 
Romania